In the past, Kosovo’s capabilities to develop a modern health care system were limited.
Low GDP during 1990 worsened the situation even more. However, the establishment of the Faculty of Medicine in the University of Pristina marked a significant development in health care. This was also followed by launching different health clinics which enabled better conditions for professional development.

Nowadays the situation has changed and health care system in Kosovo is organized in three sectors including, primary, secondary and tertiary health care.
Primary health care in Pristina is organized in thirteen Family Medicine Centers and fifteen Ambulantory Care Units. Secondary health care is decentralized in seven Regional Hospitals. Though Pristina does not have a Regional Hospital, it instead uses the University Clinical Center of Kosovo for health care services. The University Clinical Center of Kosovo provides its health care services in twelve clinics, where 642 doctors are employed. At a lower level, home services are provided for several vulnerable groups which are not able to reach health care premises. Kosovo health care services are now focused on patient's safety, quality control and assisted health.

Nowadays, health care institutions are going through some profound reforms that target providing decentralized services and covering all community residents by health insurance packages.

Statistics

The Statistical Agency of Kosovo is a professional institution operating since 1948, located in Pristina, which collects, processes and publishes official statistical data.  Since 2011, this agency functions under the Prime Minister’s office. It is funded by the Kosovo Consolidated Budget and it is supported by donors. They have professional and technical cooperation with all ministries of Kosovo's Government, especially with the Ministry of Economy and Finance, the Central Bank of Kosovo, Eurostat, International Monetary Fund, World Bank, SIDA, DFID, UNFPA, UNDP, UNICEF and many other international institutions.
According to a study made by Kosovo's Ministry of Public Administration, the number of female employees in Kosovo's health institutions has been distinctly bigger during the previous years. In 2010 there were 8,928 female employees and 4,282 males. This number had a minor increase in favor of male employees by 1% in 2012.

University Clinical Center of Kosovo (UCCK) has had 870 doctors in a period of 2010. In 2012 this number dropped off in 642. The department of gynaecology has had the largest number of personnel throughout the last 3 years, while neurosurgery has had the lowest.

The mortality rate has had many variations, thus in 2009 it was 836 patients in Regional Hospitals out of which 39% in Prizren's Regional Hospital, 21.5% in Peja, 20% in Gjakova, 17.7% in Gjilan, 1.0 in Vushtrri and 0.1% in Ferizaj. However, in 2010 mortality rate slightly decreased in 806. Prizren remained the region with the largest mortality rate during these years, whereas Gjakova and Peja gradually equalized.

Health care divisions

After the 1999 war, Kosovo has done some major improvements in its health care. During this period, medical services in Kosovo have received several donations and international financial support has raised dramatically. Many buildings have been constructed and renovated, the staff number expanded, and the number of patients seeking for medical services is increasing everyday and more.
The highest health care authority in the Republic of Kosovo is Ministry of Health of Kosovo.

As in other countries, Kosovo's health care system is organized into three levels: primary, secondary and tertiary health care.

Primary Health Care (PHC)

Primary Health Care relates to the professional health care services offered to the community, usually from a nurse or general practitioner. It covers a wide range of health and preventative services such as supporting and taking care equally for all community, including those who have lower income, provide health education, counseling disease prevention, screening and promoting better living environments. Primary health care became a fundamental concept for World Health Organization as a result of the Alma Ata Declaration (1978). Since the Declaration of Alma-Ata, health situation at country level has gone through major changes. There have been many modifications in demographic profiles, socio-economic environment and reducement of risk exposure and common diseases.
Primary health care is available for individuals and families, coming from different municipalities, with affordable costs that can be covered by the Government funds as well as community.
Kosovo consists of an overall 36 municipalities, all of which has their own PHC medical centers. Kosovo Primary Health Care is organized in two separate levels such as: Family Medicine Centers (FM) and Ambulatory Health Care Units.
Geographically isolated municipalities, have established also some maternities, such as Women Welfare Centers, that serve for women emergency well-being cases.

Family Medicine Centers
The table below shows main Family Medicine Centers in Prishtina and their locations.

Ambulatory Medical Units
The table below shows Ambulantory Medical Units in Prishtina and their locations.

Lack of family medicine specialists

Family Health Care Centers in Kosovo are in need of 1,000 family medical specialists. Currently there are approximately 500 family doctors providing primary health care services. Primary Medical Centers usually deal with problems such as, short data on citizen registry, incorrect addresses and a large number of community migration from rural to urban territories. Recently, the Ministry of Health has signed an agreement with British College, to train Kosovo graduated doctors in UK.

Secondary Health Care
Secondary health care refers to a higher level of health care system, in which patients from primary health care are referred for more specialized treatments. Secondary health care level includes medical services provided by a specialist or more advanced facilities, upon referral from a primary care physician that requires more specialized knowledge, skill or equipment than the primary care physician.
Secondary prevention programs identify and treat  asymptomatic people, who have already been exposed to different risk factors or have any pre-clinical diseases, without any clinical symptom. These activities are focused on early screening of asymptomatic patients, that are prone to develop the disease without any possible prevention or treatment. Screening tests are an example of secondary prevention activities, since they are performed even on patients who did not manifest any clinical symptoms of diseases, such as: hyperlipidemia, hypertension, breast, prostate cancer and many others. Secondary health care is offered by regional hospitals in municipalities such as Mitrovica, Peć, Gjakova, Prizren and Gjilan.

Regional Hospitals

Besides University Clinical Center of Kosovo (UCCK), which is the only tertiary health care center, there are also seven regional hospitals that offer secondary health care services. Most of referred patients to UCCK come from regional hospitals.
Regional hospitals in Kosovo are:
 Prizren’s regional hospital
 Peć’s regional hospital
 Gjakova’s regional hospital
 Ferizaj’s regional hospital
 Gjilan’s regional hospital
 Mitrovica’s regional hospital
 Vučitrn’s regional hospital

Tertiary Health Care

Tertiary health care is the highest specialized medical level, which offers more complex procedures and treatments performed by specialists. Tertiary activities involve treatment of already established diseases, manages to restore patients to their highest functional level, minimizes negative effects of disease and further complications.

Kosovo's tertiary health care specialized medical services are offered by medical institutions such as University Clinical Center of Kosovo, University Dentistry Clinical Center of Kosovo, National Blood Transfusion Center, National Institute of Labor Medicine, Medical Center for Sport and Recreation, National Institute of Public Health and Faculty of Medicine, University of Pristina. Many tertiary health care services are mistakenly used instead of primary and secondary health care services from Kosovo inhabitants.

University Clinical Center of Kosovo (UCCK)
University Clinical Center of Kosovo is the main tertiary health care institution located in Prishtina, which offers most specialized medical services. It consists of Emergency Care Center, 12 clinics, National Institute of Public Health, Central Pharmacy, Private Pharmacies, and Institutes like Anatomy, Pathology, Physiology, Pharmacology and Toxicology.

UCCK Clinics - Human Resources

This table shows the overall human resources working in University Clinical Center of Kosovo, including specialized doctors and nurses for 12 clinics, Emergency Care Unit, National Institute of Public Health Kosovo and Central Pharmacy.

National Institute of Public Health in Kosovo

National Institute of Public Health (NIPH) was established on 5 June 1925 and it is the highest medical, professional, and scientific institution. The institution organizes and applies the strategy of public health hygienic-sanitary measures, prophylactic-epidemically measures, social-medical, health education, EPI (expanded program on immunization), health promotion, water, food and air quality controls, health policy, economy of health, and develops scientific research works in the territory of the Republic of Kosovo. Hence, the Institute is known as the educational base of the Faculty of Medicine and is divided in five departments: Epidemiology, Human Ecology, Social Medicine, Micro-biology and Health Information System; Kosovo School of Public Health.

Development history of NIPH

The 1920s were characterized by very bad medical conditions in the Balkans.  In general, based on the Kosovar health care condition and the overall public health situation, a decision was made to establish hygiene and epidemiological services in the city of Peć with the "Rockfeler" fund support from the U.S and on 5 June 1925 this service finally began to work. On the same day, basis were set for Preventive Medicine in Kosovo and 5 June is marked as a festive day for founding of the Institute of Public Health.
After that date, sanitary stations, hygienic and microbiological or epidemiological services were established in Pristina, Prizren and Mitrovica. In these units there was a great lack of specialized staff (except in Prizren), but health services were performed by health employees with medical school degrees.
In ancient Prizren, during 1923/1924, it was established the highly efficient bacteriological service which provided services to the entire territory of Kosovo at that time (a part of Sandžak and Montenegro). Yet, Dr. Isuf Dedushaj stated that it was only bacteriological service which later developed into the hygienic-sanitary services in order to be later transformed into the Regional Institute of Public Health of Prizren.
During the years 1946/1947, the first Albanian doctor Dr. Durmish Celina started his work by developing educational-medical activities. At that time, Dr. Daut Mustafa lectured professional courses in the medical high school too.

The Inheritance of many infectious diseases had damaged the country in terms of economy, culture, education, and health. Prior to World War II and especially after it ended, the health condition and the circumstances in Kosovo were extremely difficult. There were many serious infectious diseases such as: malaria, typhus, louse, tuberculosis, measles, meningitis, diphtheria, and other diseases which led to killing hundreds to thousands infants.
It is important to emphasize the fact that in Kosovo in 1940 there were 5 hospitals with 390 beds, 36 different ambulatory medical and preventive services that had 5 sanitary-epidemiological stations, from which only three had worked. Dr. Isuf Dedushaj stated that in all these medical institutions there were 38 doctors, 20 private pharmacists, one dentist, and around 85 medical workers that have learned from medical practice and courses offered at that time. After World War II, Kosovo had terrible living conditions and the illiteracy rate was about 98%.

In the early 1946, Kosovo had five hospitals with 333 beds, on average 0.4 beds per 1,000 inhabitants, 9 doctors (foreign and local), 15 pharmacists, 6 medical technicians, 11 cleaners, and 27 other medical workers with lower qualification. The medical protection was offered in 8 cities, 3 villages, and 1 anti-tuberculosis dispensary, whereas in the dental prevention program there were 4 dentists.

University Dentistry Clinical Center (UDCCK)

University Dentistry Clinical Center (UDCCK) is located in Pristina and it is the main medical, educational, and scientific institution in the field of dentistry in Kosovo, and their mission is to maintain and develop good oral health. Their staff participates in different local and international meetings, training, professional and scientific conferences. The outcome of these activities is primarily increasing the efficiency of the dental procedures in order to maintain with the contemporary developments in dentistry. The application of the Health Information System in UDCCK endorsed their work in developing in terms of dental medicine, since it provides reliable data, in collaboration with the Ministry of Health in Kosovo, to establish dental medicine welfare in general.

Development history of UDCCK

The history of Kosovo dental medicine began with the practical training in the laboratory of Medical High School in Pristina. At that time, dentistry section was established where 96 dentists worked. The Section of Dentistry was organized in independent working units and they were: Prosthetic Dental Clinic, Tooth Disease Clinic, Mouth Disease Clinic, Preventive Dentistry Clinic, Oral Surgery, Teeth and X-ray Laboratory and Working Community. In Dentistry Section there were 177 employers, 44 doctors, 20 assistants, 9 trainee assistants, 29 dental technicians, 50 medical technician, 15 administrative staff and 32 support staff. The educational and health activities were mainly conducted in the Charitable Humanitarian Organization "Mother Teresa" in Prishtina. Since June 1999, dentistry clinics became part of the UDCCK until November 2003, when an important event for dentistry occurred when the Ministry of Health issued an Administrative Instruction 12/2003, on the Establishment of UDCCK as an autonomous and independent institution from University Clinical Center of Kosovo (UCCK).

Private registered Dentistry Clinics
Based on the publications of Ministry of Health in Kosovo, there are only 248 licensed private dental clinics, even though there are around 921 registered dental clinics through Kosovo.

Private hospitals
Licensed Private hospitals in Kosovo are the following: Special Hospital for Cardiovascular Diseases "Intermed", Specialized Hospital for Cardiovascular Diseases "International Medicine Hospital", and Cabinet Coronarography "Diagnostica".

American Hospital is a private hospital in Pristina inaugurated on 6 April 2012. American Hospital in Kosovo is a Bedminster Capital Management Fund investment, based in New York, whose participants are the Government of the United States of America. It is represented by the Office of Foreign Investment (OPIC), the European Bank for Reconstruction and Development and different American investors. It has an area of 3000m2, 4 floors, 30 hospital beds, 3 surgery rooms, 2 maternity rooms, 2 suits with advanced equipment and about 100 employees available to provide professional medical services.

University of Pristina, Faculty of Medicine

University of Pristina was founded on June, 17th 1969, though it started working on December that year. First lectures were held in the philosophic department of the university.

Faculty of Medicine consists of 6 departments such as general medicine, pharmacy, physiotherapy, dentistry, and nursery.
The General Medicine and Dentistry studies last 6 years, Pharmacy lasts 5 years, whereas Physiotherapy and Nursery last 3 years.

Initially the Faculty of Medicine in Pristina started off with only General medicine, but 6 years later the section of dentistry was founded. On May, 15th 1996 the Pharmacy section was founded and later on in 2001 the Physiotherapy was founded as well.

Nowadays Faculty of Medicine, University of Prishtina is an integral part of University Clinical Center of Kosovo.

Departments, Students

About 1,985 students attend medical lectures every year.
The actual Minister of Health, Prof. Dr. Ferid Agani, stated that "Faculty of Medicine is looking forward to become an independent part of University of Pristina, and the whole idea is to create Biomedical University whose rector will be a doctor, and the six departments of Faculty of Medicine will be transferred to the Biomedical University.
If established, the Medical Science Faculty will be the third public university in Kosovo, right after University of Pristina and University of Prizren.

Regulation and oversight

Ministry of Health

The Ministry of Health  operates under the Government of Kosovo in accordance with its Constitution and applicable laws. The Government of Kosovo is composed by the prime minister, vice-prime ministers and ministers.  It is located in the centre of the capital of Kosovo, Prishtina.
The work of Ministry of Health is organized through the Department of Finance and general Services, Legal Department, Department for Health Information Systems, Department for Health Services, Department for European Integration and Policy Coordination, Department for Strategic Health Development and Department for Health Services in Prisons.
The Ministry of Health is responsible, among others, to draft policies and ensure law implementation, promote non-discrimination approach on health care system, sets norms and standards respecting relevant international health standards. The ministry of Health coordinates activities in the health sector including environment protection.
Kosovo Health care functions are based on the following principles: equity, quality, equal treatment, sustainable financial conditions, cost-efficient services.

Directorate of Health, Municipality of Prishtina

Department of Health and Social Welfare

According to the local government laws, the department of Health and Social Welfare creates strategies for primary health care, diagnosis and basic health care, including minor surgeries, oral health promotion and basic dental care, quality assurance of food and water, ensuring the provision of social services and families within its territory, through the activities of the Center for Social Work (CSW) or by providing financial or other assistance to non-governmental organizations dealing with this activity.

Public Health Care Institution's Human Resources compared to other countries

The table below shows, Human Resources working in Public Health Care institutions in Kosovo, compared to other countries, based on Health Sector Strategy provided from Ministry of Health Kosovo.

Health care system efficiency and equity

Different national and international reports have shown that Kosovo inhabitants are very unsatisfied with health care services offered, and corruption is prevalent and a persistent challenge for health sector, though such conclusions were reached without in-depth analyses. UNDP committed on designing Public Pulse Report, to conduct more in-depth analyses around perceptions of corruption in health sector, and measure patient satisfaction with health care services in Kosovo.
Public Pulse Report recruited a sample of 1,334 patients, who were treated in public health care institutions around Kosovo.
Results showed that patients are highly satisfied with health care services offered, due to the fact that more than 70% answered to be satisfied or very satisfied with the health care services, personnel and support they received in the health care institutions. Meanwhile, corruption was shown to be less prevalent than reported in other studies, only 4% of respondents solicited for a bribe during their most recent visit in public health care centers.
 Overall satisfaction with healthcare institutions

Results of Public Pulse Report, indicate that respondents were generally satisfied with health care services offered in Family Medicine Centers, Regional hospitals and University Clinical Center of Kosovo.
The highest dissatisfaction was shown with University Clinical Center performance. Almost 30% of respondents were unsatisfied with treatment offered. On the other hand, 70% were satisfied or highly satisfied.
Additionally, 25% of patients treated on Regional Hospitals and Family Medicine Centers were unsatisfied or very unsatisfied with health care services, while only 15% of patients treated on private clinics were unsatisfied. Meanwhile, patients who visited pharmacies expressed high satisfaction with services obtained, 86% were satisfied.
Therefore, the most satisfied patients were the ones who received services in pharmacies and private health care institutions, followed by patients who were treated in Regional Hospitals and Family Medicine Centers.
 Costs of medical treatments

Majority of Public Pulse Report respondents (43%), declared that they did not pay for services offered in public health care institutions. Only 666 respondents out of 1,334, paid for health care services provided.
Patients coming from rural areas, approximately pay 50 to 200 Euros, to travel to their closest medical center, which still remains one of the most concerning problems of Kosovo health care system.
 Doctors performance

Public Pulse Report respondents (16%), were mostly concerned of the short time doctors spent with them and their involvement in decision-making was very low. The strongest attribute of Kosovo doctors is the respect they give to their patients, since only 225 (15%) of patients complained on that side.
 Perceptions on presence of corruption on health care

Corruption still remains a big challenge for public health care institutions. From the Public Pulse Report, 52 respondents (4%) of the sample answered affirmatively, indicating that they were solicited during their last visit. On the other hand, the majority (96%) did not report such situations. Bribes are mostly used as a way to obtain easier and earlier health care services in public health care institutions.

Immunization

Kosovo has a fixed and regimented childhood immunization schedule as part of the Kosovo National Immunization Program. This schedule is supported by Article 28 of the Law for Prevention and Fighting against Infectious Diseases 2007 that mandates that childhood vaccination for tuberculosis, hepatitis B, whooping cough, diphtheria, child paralysis, tetanus, measles, parotitis and rubella are obligatory. According to the same law, failure to adhere to this will result in a 500 to 1000 euro fine.

Drug efficacy and safety

In the region of Prishtina there are 116 Licensed Pharmacies Registered. They are all licensed from Kosovo Medicines Agency (KMA) and Kosovo Customs which has the duty to control the import of pharmaceutical products and medical devices. Hence, a valid import license is required in order to import these products and it is regulated by the Law on Medical products and Equipment, No. 03/L-188, Article 14, and other legal norms. KMA is liable to protect the health, provide quality and guaranteed medical products, equipment, and services through the licensing of professional companies and individuals and yet, "regulates the production, import and distribution of medicinal products, active substances, herbal products, dietary supplements, excipients, therapeutic dosage vitamins, medical equipment (medical imaging machines, medical lasers, life support equipment, in vitro diagnostic, etc)."

Kosovo Health Care Budget

The table below shows Kosovo Health Care Budget for 2012, based on Health Statistics 2012 report prepared from Kosovo Prime Minister's office.

Health Reform
Health reform system has been discussed for a long time on the post-war period. Fourteen years after the 1999 war, year 2014 still marks serious problems in health sector, including ongoing efforts on health care reform and health care insurance law implementation. Delays on law voting process, because of some technical errors, have a direct impact on beginning of reformation process of the health care system. These delays on implementation are mostly happening because of the ongoing debate if the law should or should not state that public sector should be divided from the private sector of health care system. Health care specialists claim that opposition of dividing private from public sector is intended to be done by law with a purpose of undergoing the ambiguity embedded in UCCK. Recently, Chambers of Doctors started operating, which now immediately will lead to further progression on health reform. The Chamber of Doctors is going to be responsible in forming the ethical code and also to decentralize and carry out major responsibilities that currently are carried by Ministry of Health. In on-ongoing public debates on Health Care System and Health Care Insurance law, some small changes are requested in favor of citizens, including also health care insurance coverage for every citizen of Kosovo.

Health Insurance
Health Insurance through years

Health care sector within the last 60 years, has passed through a very difficult transition period.
If we go back in time, we find out that social insurance, also including health insurance packages, in Kosovo first started on 1945 based on some by-laws. During that time there were many attempts, trying to spread health insurance packages in different society categories. After some profound constitutional changes on former Yugoslavia on 1965, all inhabitants got covered by a basic health insurance package, founded by  Government's special fund. Starting from 70s to 90s because of a very complicated political situation, Kosovo inhabitants were not allowed to get covered by any health insurance packages. Starting from 1999, when Kosovo finally became independent, there was a 60 million dollars investment in health sector, though small progressions are done by now.

Health Insurance in recent years

Starting from 2007, Kosovo health insurance law was approved. Funds for health insurance packages were collected from personal income taxes. After a period of time, generating health insurance funds from community incomes, did not prove to function in the right way, so now health insurance law is being reconsidered. Comparing Kosovo to other regional countries, we can state that Kosovo is the only regional country that still does not have an approved and functional health insurance law. Kosovo Healthcare Reform includes some profound changes on financial, organizational and functional healthcare system, targeting here also the Health Insurance Law.

Kosovo Federation of Health Syndicate is fully dedicated to accomplish legal structure that is needed for further processing with health insurance law.
Kosovo federation of Health Syndicate main targets are the following:
 Constructing legal infrastructure, than creating Health Insurance Law;
 Offering a basic package for all Kosovo inhabitants;
 Offering qualitative services;
 Creating and maintaining regional network with other states, learning from their experiences.

Though health insurance is an essential human right, nowadays many Kosovo inhabitants still consider health insurance as an expensive luxury privilege. Up to date, all health care services provided in public facilities are covered by Governmental funds, distributed to the Municipal Health Directorate. Only 2% of Kosovo inhabitants are covered by private health insurance companies.

Private Insurance Companies

Private Insurance Companies are organized in a joint association called the Insurance Association of Kosovo (IAS). This association was established in 2002 with the agreement of the licensed  insurance companies in Kosovo. They seek to improve the insurance industry in Kosovo, to stabilize the insurance market and to offer trainings to the companies.
The insurance companies in Kosovo are the following:

Medical Agencies and Associations
Patients' Rights Association in Kosovo (PRAK) is an independent and non-profit association. Its main activities include promotion, education, public meetings, information outreach, conferences, and seminars.

Albanian Health Initiative (AHI) goal is to identify and eliminate health care inequalities that exist in the Albanian-American community. This initiative promotes preventive screening measures and efficient utilized health care resources, in order to improve the quality of care and strengthen the patient-physician relationship. Also, a very precious member of AHI is Dr. James Strickler. Since 2000, Dr. James C. Strickler, Emeritus Professor of Medicine, Family Medicine Doctor, and former Dean of Dartmouth Medical School, has supervised the student exchange program between Dartmouth Medical School and University of Pristina, Faculty of Medicine. More than 200 students have benefited from the program. Some of the Albanian exchange students have successfully obtained ECFMG certification, who have done research for medical institutions in the United States and have joined the Albanian American Medical Society. With the ongoing effort of Dr. Strickler, Geisel Medical School has raised more than $4.5 million for the development of health care programs in Kosovo.

Albanian Health Fund (AHF) has recruited, planned, and sent small teams of medical and surgical personnel to Albania who participated in teaching and clinical interaction with Albanian specialists. The AHF main goals are continuation of tutorials on given medical specialties for the Albanian medical community, providing medical supplies and equipment, organizing medical study trips to the United States for selected Albanian doctors and many other public activities.

MediGAL is the association of health managers in Kosovo. It has done many activities, where as the latest and most important activity was the Swedish donation of 350 external breast prostheses for patients with surgical mastectomy. The donation came from the Swedish association called Parlan which was established by women who have had problems of this nature.
The Ministry of Health of Kosovo has recently signed a cooperation agreement with the Association of Kosovo Medigal Health Management and Special Education Organization "Ozel Egitim Kurumlari Irem" from Turkey, for extensive cooperation in health sector. This agreement was signed by Minister of Health, Prof. Dr. Ferid Agani, Dr. Genc Demjaha DMD, MBA from MediGAL and Mr. Zylfikar Aklar for Irem Ozel Egitim Kurumlari. The agreement commits on helping patients to being treated in Turkey by medical specialists, if those cases cannot be treated in Kosovo.

See also
 Government of Kosovo
 Demographics of Kosovo

References

External links
 UCCK 
 American Hospital in Prishtina
 EDA Hospital in Prishtina 
 QKSUK
 Ministria e Shendetesise
 Siguria
 Sigkos
 Sigal Uniqa Group Austria
 Illyria
 Elsig
 Faculty of Medicine

 
Hospitals in Kosovo